RAAF Wagga Heritage Centre (Originally known as the Wagga Wagga RAAF Museum but was officially, RAAF Museum – Wagga Annex) is a heritage centre located at the Wagga Wagga RAAF Base at Forest Hill located approximately  east of Wagga Wagga, New South Wales, Australia on the Sturt Highway. The heritage centre has indoor and outdoor displays of aircraft, memorabilia and photographs relating to the RAAF in the Riverina.

History
Wagga Wagga RAAF Museum was officially opened in June 1995 from items from the RAAF Base Wagga and items which was donated by the community.
The museum was closed in 2001 for refurbishment with the memorabilia temporarily relocated to the Point Cook RAAF museum but plans to reopen the museum were quietly scrapped after the RAAF adopted a new policy in 2003, which stated that the RAAF would only fund RAAF museum at Point Cook.

AirCare and Wagga Wagga based newspaper The Daily Advertiser ran a campaign during late September and early October 2008 in an attempt to reverse the Australian Defence Force's decision.

On 13 December 2008, it was announced that the museum will be reopening in 2009. The Air Force would spend 75,000 completing the refurbishment of the museum building, due to be complete in 2009 sometime.

In May 2009, a public consultation meeting was held to discuss plans for the centre, including the A$130,000 set aside by the Royal Australian Air Force for outfitting the building for a future heritage display.

On 12 March 2010, it was reported that the heritage centre was expected to reopen in Spring 2010, but the official opening date was to be announced at a later date.

On 29 July 2010, Air Marshal Mark Binskin announced at the RAAF Base Wagga 70th anniversary that the heritage centre will open on 15 October 2010. The heritage centre was officially opened on the 12 October 2010 and will open three days a week.

See also

RAAF Aviation Heritage Museum
List of aerospace museums

References

External links
 RAAF Heritage Centres - includes RAAF Wagga Heritage Centre

History of Wagga Wagga
Aerospace museums in Australia
Museums in New South Wales
Air force museums
Military and war museums in Australia
Royal Australian Air Force
1995 establishments in Australia
Museums established in 1995
History of the Royal Australian Air Force